Flo  (stylised in uppercase) are a British girl group from London consisting of members Jorja Douglas, Stella Quaresma, and Renée Downer. The group formed in 2019 and signed to Island Records, where they released their breakthrough single "Cardboard Box", which preceded their debut extended play, The Lead (2022). Flo later topped the BBC's Sound of 2023 poll, and won the 2023 Brit Award for Rising Star.

Members 

Stella Quaresma was born in Kingston upon Thames, and at four weeks old, she moved to Mozambique. She moved back to the British countryside at the age of five, before returning to London, where she began attending the Sylvia Young Theatre School, where she met bandmate Renée Downer. Quaresma was a year above Downer. She grew up listening to African musical artists and her mother later introduced her to Etta James and British artists like Amy Winehouse. Prior to being in the group, she worked as a waitress.

Jorja Douglas was born in Eastern Germany, before moving to Hertfordshire at eight months old. She grew up listening to R&B music introduced to her by her mother. She is the daughter of former sprinter Stephi Douglas, and in 2017, she competed in and won the second series of the CBBC competition series Got What It Takes?. Prior to being in the group, Douglas worked for an accountancy firm.

Renée Downer was born and raised in North London. She attended the Sylvia Young Theatre School, where she met bandmate Stella Quaresma, who was a year above Downer. She grew up listening to R&B, house and church gospel. Prior to being in the group, she worked in H&M on Regent Street.

Career 
Flo formed in 2019. Quaresma and Downer knew each other having met studying at Sylvia Young Theatre School and discovered Douglas from her singing videos on Instagram. Their debut single, "Cardboard Box", was produced by British record producer MNEK and was released on 24 March 2022 after they signed to Island Records. The song performed well on social media, and weeks later, an accompanying music video followed in April 2022, which amassed 900 thousand views in a few days. An acoustic version of the song was released the following month. Also produced by MNEK, their second single "Immature" and its accompanying music video was released in July 2022, ahead of their debut extended play The Lead on 8 July 2022. A music video for "Summertime", also produced by MNEK, was released. Flo re-released The Lead in September 2022 along with a promotional single, "Not My Job". 

Flo performed on Jimmy Kimmel Live! for the first time on 6 October 2022, which was their television debut. They made their UK television debut on Later... with Jools Holland the following month. On 1 November 2022, they was included in Vevo DSCVR's Artists to Watch 2023. They performed their songs "Feature Me" and "Not My Job" on the channel.

Flo then made their first award show performance at the 2022 MOBO Awards with a medley of the songs "Immature" and "Cardboard Box". In December 2022, Flo became the first female group to top the BBCs Annual Sound of... poll and win the Brit Rising Star at the Brit Awards in the same year. In January 2023, Flo was featured on "Hide & Seek" by British rapper Stormzy. The song is from the latter's third studio album, This Is What I Mean (2022).

Artistry

Musical style 
Flo's style distinctly draws upon classic R&B and hip-hop, particularly from the 1990s and early 2000s. The visuals for their debut music video Cardboard Box invited comparisons to that of TLC's "Unpretty" (1999) and the Sugababes' "Overload" (2000). In addition to the likes of Destiny's Child and the Spice Girls, H.E.R. was named as a more contemporary influence.

Influences 

All three girls described being shaped by the music they grew up listening to; Downer's mother would play Aaliyah and Ciara in the car, and Douglas' mother was into "old school R&B". Quaresma heard African music from her father, while her mother would play Amy Winehouse and Etta James.

Discography

Extended plays

Singles

Guest appearances

Promotional singles

Tours
 FLO Live (2023)

Filmography

Television

Music videos
 "Cardboard Box" (2022)
 "Immature"   (2022)
 "Summertime" (2022)
 "Losing You" (2022)

Awards and nominations

References 

2019 establishments in England
Black British musical groups
British musical trios
British R&B girl groups
English girl groups
Island Records artists
Musical groups established in 2021
Musical groups from London
Vocal trios